William Olin Stillman (September 9, 1856 - March 24, 1924) was an American physician, animal welfare activist, humanitarian and medical writer.

Biography

Stillman was born in Normansville, New York. He graduated from Albany Medical College in 1878 and worked as a physician at a sanitarium in Saratoga Springs (1878-1883). He obtained a Master of Arts from Union College in 1880. He lectured on the history of medicine at Albany Medical School and wrote many medical publications. He received his M.D. in 1878.

He was physician to the Open Door Mission and Hospital for Incurables (1887-1888) and to the Dominican Monastery and the Home For Christian Workers. He married Frances M. Rice on April 18, 1880.

Stillman supported the humane treatment of animals and children and was president of the American Humane Association for 20 years. He was president of the Mohawk & Hudson River Humane Society for 36 years. He was chairman of the New York State Humane Education Committee and president of the International Federation of Societies for Animal Protection. Stillman established the Be Kind to Animals Week in 1915.

Award

The American Humane Association offers the William O. Stillman award to animals who in the face of danger have saved human lives or vice versa. The award is given "for recognition of a humane act of rescuing animals at personal risk or of the rescue by an animal of human life by virtue of extreme intelligence in an emergency. To an individual or to an animal."

Selected publications

The Future of the New York State Historical Association (1912)
The Prevention of Cruelty to Animals (1912)

References

Further reading

Sydney H. Coleman. (1924). Dr. William O. Stillman and the American Humane Association. In Humane Society Leaders in America. The American Humane Association.

1856 births
1924 deaths
19th-century American physicians
Albany Medical College alumni
American animal welfare scholars
American animal welfare workers
American humanitarians
American medical writers
Union College (New York) alumni